Erik Nordsæter Resell (born 28 September 1996) is a Norwegian racing cyclist, who currently rides for UCI ProTeam . He competed in the men's team time trial event at the 2017 UCI Road World Championships.

Major results
2016
 1st  National CX Championships
2018
 1st Omloop Het Nieuwsblad Beloften
 2nd Paris–Tours Espoirs
 4th Gylne Gutuer
 8th Ruota d'Oro
2019
 9th Ringerike GP
 9th Gylne Gutuer
 10th Himmerland Rundt
2021
 5th Road race, National Road Championships
 10th Kuurne–Brussels–Kuurne

References

External links

1996 births
Living people
Norwegian male cyclists
Sportspeople from Trondheim